Marie Pauline Garon (September 9, 1900 – August 30, 1965) was a Canadian silent film, feature film, and stage actress.

Early life
Marie Pauline Garon was born in Montreal, Quebec, Canada on September 9, 1898, the daughter of Pierre-Auguste Garon & Victoria Connick. She was of French and Irish descent and Canadian nationality. Her father first worked for the Canadian postal department, then worked at an insurance agency, where he managed to gain enough money to send his youngest child (out of eleven children) to the Couvent Sacré-Coeur (Sacred Heart Convent) in Montreal, one of the most prestigious schools in the city. Garon attended this school for seven years. She was the first graduate of the institution to perform in the theatre. Pauline Garon did not learn English until she was ten years old. At around 20 years old, Pauline Garon ran away to New York City where she began work on Broadway theatre New York, USA.

Film career
Garon made her film debut in Remodeling Her Husband as a body double for Dorothy Gish. She was associated with D.W. Griffith when she first came to Hollywood in 1920. Garon's first important role came in 1921's The Power Within. She also played the body double for Sylvia Breamer in Doubling for Romeo (1921).

In 1923, she was hailed as Cecil B. DeMille's big new discovery. He cast her in only two films. One was Adam's Rib (1923). She was selected as one of the WAMPAS Baby Stars in 1923. Even before her "discovery", Garon had been a steadily rising star. She appeared opposite Owen Moore in Reported Missing (1922). Garon received much praise for her role in Henry King's adaptation of Sonny. She had been chosen for this role by King after he saw her portray the role in the stage production on Broadway. She co-starred with Richard Barthelmess in the First National Pictures release. 

Garon was making at least five films a year after her popularity soared. She was playing many lead roles in B movies and supporting roles in more glamorous films. She co-starred with Gloria Swanson and John Boles in The Love of Sunya (1927).

By 1928, Garon's career began to decline dramatically. She appeared mostly in French renditions of Paramount Pictures movies. She was cast in less popular English films as well. By the early 1930s, Garon was given small uncredited roles. By 1934, she had vanished from film. Garon played a bit part in How Green Was My Valley (1941) and appeared briefly in two westerns, Song of the Saddle (1936) and The Cowboy and the Blonde (1941).

Personal life

On February 20, 1928, Garon became an American citizen.

While filming The Average Woman in 1924 rumors began to spread that Garon had become engaged to Gene Sarazen, the professional golfer. In March 1924 she issued a complete denial of the rumors.

Garon married three times. She wed Lowell Sherman on February 15, 1926. Sherman's influence led Garon to refuse a long-term contract with Paramount.

She separated from Sherman in August 1927. In February 1940 she eloped with radio star and actor, Clyde Harland Alban, to Yuma, Arizona. Garon and Alban divorced in 1942. She married Ross Forrester, widower of actress Marion Aye, in May 1953 and remained with him until he died.

Death
Garon died at Patton State Hospital a psychiatric institution in San Bernardino, California in August 30,1965 ten days before her 65th birthday. The cause of death was a brain disorder. Garon's health had been precarious for some time. She collapsed at the 20th Century Fox studios in June 5,1952.

Selected filmography

 A Manhattan Knight (1920) - The Daughter
 The Power Within (1921) - Pauline
 Polly of the Follies (1922) - Ziegfeld Beauty Chorus Girl (uncredited)
 Reported Missing (1922) - Pauline Blake
 Sonny (1922) - Florence Crosby
 Manslaughter (1922) - (uncredited)
 The Man from Glengarry (1922) - Mamie St. Clair
 You Can't Fool Your Wife (1923) - Vera Redell
 Children of Dust (1923) - Helen Raymond
 Glengarry School Days (1923) - Margie Baird
 Forgive and Forget (1923) - Virginia Clark
 Adam's Rib (1923) - Mathilda Ramsay
 The Marriage Market (1923) - Theodora Bland
 The Average Woman (1924) - Sally Whipple
 Pal o' Mine (1924) - Babette Hermann
 The Spitfire (1924) - Marcia Walsh
 Wine of Youth (1924) - Tish Tatum
 The Turmoil (1924) - Edith Sheridan
 The Painted Flapper (1924) - Arline Whitney
 What the Butler Saw (1924) - Joan Wyckham
 Speed (1925) - Wiletta Whipple
 Passionate Youth (1925) - Henrietta Rand
 Fighting Youth (1925) - Jean Manley
 Where Was I? (1925) - Claire
 The Love Gamble (1925) - Jennie Howard
 The Great Sensation (1925) - Peggy Howell
 Satan in Sables (1925) - Colette Breton
 The Farmer from Texas (1925) - Miss Abby Grant
 Compromise (1925) - Nathalie
 Rose of the World (1925) - Edith Rogers
 The Splendid Road (1925) - Angel Allie
 Flaming Waters (1925) - Doris Laidlaw
 The Virgin Wife (1926) - Mary Jordan
 Christine of the Big Tops (1926) - Christine
 Driven from Home (1927)
 The Love of Sunya (1927) - Anna Hagan
 The Princess on Broadway (1927) - Mary Ryan
 Eager Lips (1927) - Mary Lee
 Naughty (1927) - The Bride
 Ladies at Ease (1927) - Polly
 The College Hero (1927) - Vivian Saunders
 Temptations of a Shop Girl (1927) - Betty Harrington
 The Heart of Broadway (1928; survives at Library of Congress) - Roberta Clemmons
 The Girl He Didn't Buy (1928) - Ruth Montaigne
 Dugan of the Dugouts (1928) - Betty
 The Devil's Cage (1928) - Eloise
 Riley of the Rainbow Division (1928) - Gertie Bowers
 Must We Marry? (1928) - Betty Jefferson
 The Candy Kid (1928)
 Redskin (1928) - Party Girl (uncredited)
 The Gamblers (1929) - Isabel Emerson
 In the Headlines (1929) - Blondie
 The Show of Shows (1929) - Performer in 'Bicycle Built for Two' Number
 Le spectre vert (1930) - Lady Violette
 The Thoroughbred (1930) - Margie
 Garde la bombe (1930)
 Échec au roi (1931) - The Princess Anne
 Le fils de l'autre (1932)
 The Phantom Broadcast (1933) - Nancy
 Easy Millions (1933)
 By Appointment Only (1933) - Gwen Reid
 One Year Later (1933) - Vera Marks
 Wonder Bar (1934) - Telephone Operator (uncredited)
 The Merry Widow (1934) - Lola (French Version)
 Lost in the Stratosphere (1934) - Hilda Garon
 The White Cockatoo (1935) - Marianne
 Folies Bergère de Paris (1935) - Lulu
 Becky Sharp (1935) - Fifine
 Going Highbrow (1935) - Josephine - the French Maid (uncredited)
 Dangerous (1935) - Betty - Gail's Maid (uncredited)
 It Had to Happen (1936) - French Maid (uncredited)
 Song of the Saddle (1936) - Settler's wife (uncredited)
 Colleen (1936) - Maid (uncredited)
 King of Hockey (1936) - Marie (uncredited)
 Her Husband's Secretary (1937) - Louise, Carol's Maid (uncredited)
 Shall We Dance (1937) - Minor Role (uncredited)
 Bluebeard's Eighth Wife (1938) - Customer (uncredited)
 Lillian Russell (1940) - Minor Role (uncredited)
 The Cowboy and the Blonde (1941) - Office Worker (uncredited)
 How Green Was My Valley (1941) - Minor Role (uncredited)
 Bunco Squad (1950) - Mary (uncredited) (final film role)

References

Charleston Gazette, Movie Star Granted Citizenship Papers, Wednesday, February 22, 1928, p. 24.
Englewood Economist, Petite Pauline Garon Reaches Fame Rapidly, October 10, 1923, p. 6.
Hayward Daily Review, Actress Gets Divorce Decree, April 22, 1942, p. 2.
Lethbridge Herald, Behind The Scenes In Hollywood, June 9, 1952, p. 9.
Lincoln Star, Film Features From The Cinema World, Sunday, May 13, 1923, p. 31.
Lincoln Star, Film Features From The Cinema World, September 16, 1923, p. 40.
Los Angeles Times, One..In..A..Million, July 9, 1922, p. 32.
Los Angeles Times, To Honor Actress, July 16, 1922, p. 35.
Washington Post, World's Greatest Golfer, October 16, 1932, p. SM3.
Washington Post, Sarazen's Ears Nicer Than Valentino's, Agents Told Gene, But He Wised Up In Time, May 4, 1950, p. 17.

External links

Photographs and literature

1900 births
1965 deaths
American film actresses
Canadian film actresses
American silent film actresses
American stage actresses
Canadian silent film actresses
Canadian stage actresses
Canadian emigrants to the United States
French Quebecers
Actresses from Montreal
People from Greater Los Angeles
Vaudeville performers
20th-century American actresses
20th-century Canadian actresses
WAMPAS Baby Stars